Rosita was an English band formed by Marie Du Santiago and Emmy-Kate Montrose, formerly one-half of the band Kenickie, in the immediate aftermath of Kenickie's split in October 1998. Although mainly remembered as a Kenickie offshoot, they received regular coverage in their own right in the weekly UK music press, their second single, "Santa Poca's Dream" was a UK Independent Singles Chart Top 20 hit, and one of its bonus tracks, "Demon", was used as the soundtrack to a television advertisement for Leyland DAF Vans.

History
Interviewed by Melody Maker immediately after the final Kenickie gig for a headline story on the breakup, DuSantiago and Montrose announced their plans for a "multimedia extravaganza" to consist of a record label, a clubnight and some new music of their own. While the label apparently never materialised and the clubnight was the short-lived Shimmy (in Soho's Gerrard Street), the new music component materialized as their new band Rosita.

The new band was unveiled in March 1999 - as a major news item with both the NME and Melody Maker - with a line-up of Du Santiago on lead vocals and rhythm guitar and Montrose on bass and backing vocals. Completing the line-up were, on guitar, Matt McGinn - (not the singer/songwriter of the same name) who was previously a guitar technician for Kenickie and Paddy Pulzer, formerly of Swervedriver (and concurrently with Jack) on drums.  Dot Allan, Kenickie's former live keyboard player, was also initially involved but dropped out after the band's debut mini tour of southeast England.

Shortly after the tour, the band released a debut single 'Live It Down' on the Rough Trade Shop subsidiary 'For Us'. They recorded a session of five songs (including the single) for BBC Radio 1's Evening Session programme hosted by Steve Lamacq, transmitted between 23 and 26 August 1999. They also contributed one track, "Sugar" on Fierce Panda compilation Otter Than July later that summer. At around this time, an official fanclub was set up by the band and run by their friend Lucy Madison, which at its peak had over 100 members.

On 25 October 1999, Rosita performed live in concert on the Evening Session show from Liverpool's Royal Court Theatre, in a support slot for Cast (whose headline slot was also broadcast) as part of Radio 1's Sound City event. Rosita subsequently signed to Zubizaretta, a subsidiary of the Beastie Boys' Grand Royal record label. In April 2000, the label put out Rosita's second single, the Santa Poca's Dream EP, which hit No. 17 in the UK Indie singles chart. The track 'Demon', a heavy metal-style instrumental, was featured on a TV advertisement for Leyland DAF Vans and would reappear in 2002 on a BBC trailer for BBC Choice's rescreenings of the TV series 24. To promote the single, Rosita went on a seven date headline tour of the UK, supported by fellow Grand Royal artists Mika Bomb. On the final night of the tour, Mika Bomb joined Rosita onstage for their anthem 'Hey Hey Baby'. A video tour diary was filmed but apparently never screened for Channel 4's late night 4Music slot.

Following the collapse of Grand Royal and the departure of McGinn, Rosita played two further gigs in 2001 - the '$ukifun' festival in April and a concert at the Arts Café in London in August. The two dates featured new keyboardist Sarah McKeown and new guitarist Adrian Lobb of the band Vermont. In September 2001 Rosita announced their split, citing a wish to try other things in life than being in a band. After the split, DuSantiago and Montrose continued to DJ together, most notably at the Stay Beautiful club in early 2002. Otherwise, DuSantiago dropped out of music to concentrate on her day job until 2007 when, returning to the Northeast and reverting to her real name Marie Nixon, she joined folk quartet The Cornshed Sisters who have released two albums - Tell Tales (2012) and Honey and Tar (2017). Nixon also appeared, along with McKeown, on Field Music offshoot School of Language's 2008 album Sea From Shore.

Montrose also reverted to her real name, Emma Jackson, and formed female synth trio The Pictures with McKeown and producer Isabel Waidner who gigged sporadically in 2002-2003, including one 2003 London support slot for former Elastica guitarist Donna Mathews' band Klang (of which Waidner was also a member), which was reviewed by the Guardian. Since then, Jackson has occasionally played bass with the band Snakes And Ladders, and she and Waidner co-edited the journal The High Horse which ran for 10 editions from 2005 to 2007.

Matt McGinn, meanwhile, returned to his old employment as a guitar technician, eventually working for Coldplay.  In 2010, Roadie, McGinn's memoir of his time working for Coldplay, was published by Anova Books' Portico imprint.

Discography

Singles
 "Live It Down" (For Us, FU 009, 1999, 7" vinyl only)
 "Live It Down"
 "If You've Heard" (listed on sleeve as "If You've Not Heard")

 Santa Poca's Dream EP (Zubizaretta, ZUB006CD, 2000, CD & 7" vinyl) - No. 17 in UK Indie Singles Chart
 "Santa Poca's Dream"
 "Down Here" (previously known at live gigs as "Waiting For You")
 "Demon" (instrumental)

Compilations
 Otter Than July (Fierce Panda, ning078cd/ning078, 1999, CD & 7" vinyl)
 "Sugar"
(also contains tracks by Scribble, Fraff, Pop Threat, Hofman and Mo-Ho-Bish-O-Pi)

BBC Radio sessions
 Evening Session with Steve Lamacq, Radio 1, recorded 3 August 1999
 "Hey Hey Baby" (performed live on-air 3 August 1999)
 "Santa Poca's Dream" (broadcast Monday 23 August 1999)
 "This Is Tonight" (broadcast Tuesday 24 August 1999)
 "Live It Down" (broadcast Wednesday 25 August 1999)
 "Around The Town" (broadcast Thursday 26 August 1999)

 Acoustic Session live on Radio Jupitus, with Phill Jupitus GLR, summer 1999
 "Sugar"
 "Doing Fine" (aka "Around The Town")

 Evening Session Live in Concert on BBC Radio 1, 25 October 1999 from Royal Court Theatre, Liverpool, for Sound City event
 "Sugar"
 "Santa Poca's Dream"
 "Maybe I'm Right"
 "This Is Tonight"

Other songs
Songs performed live in concert but not officially released or performed on radio include:
 "Lying's Easy" (circa 1999)
 "Sugar Baby Love" - Rubettes cover version (circa 1999)
 "Weepster" aka "Weepy Horses" (circa 2000)
 "Stomper" (circa 2000)
 "Racing" (circa 2000)
 "The Man Don't" aka "L'Homme Pas Du Tot" (circa 2000)
 "Stay With Me" (circa 2000)
 "Good As Gold" (circa 2000)
 "Where's The Summer Gone?" (circa 2001)
 "Dance With Me" (circa 2001)
 "Road Movie" (circa 2001)
 "And The Stars Look Down" (circa 2001)

Timeline

References

External links
 Wayback Machine
 Rosita: This Is...

English indie rock groups
1999 establishments in England
2001 disestablishments in England
Musical groups established in 1999
Musical groups disestablished in 2001